The Cabin Fever franchise, consists of American splatter horror-comedies, including the original theatrical release, two straight-to-home media releases with a sequel and a prequel that both received limited theatrical releases, and one theatrical reboot. The plot centers around groups of friends who contract an extremely deadly flesh-eating disease, and their attempts to survive its symptoms.

The original movie was met with a generally mixed critical reception, though it was deemed a success at the box office. The second installment received an even more derived critical response, and though it earned less than its predecessor it earned a profit for the studios. The prequel film was released to negative reviews, and its monetary statistics indicate that it earned the studio income through home video sales. The 2016 remake received the least positive reception of the entire franchise, considered to be inferior to the original, and also performed poorly financially.

Films

Cabin Fever (2002) 

A group of college friends consisting of Paul, Karen, Bert, Marcy, and Jeff plan a week-long vacation getaway together, at an isolated cabin. Upon their arrival, a man infected with an undisclosed flesh-eating disease approaches them for help, though in a panicked frenzy they incinerate the man. When he falls into the local reservoir and dies, the water supply quickly becomes contaminated. Unbeknownst to the friends, their weekend partying is about to become a living nightmare as they one by one contract the sickness, and fight to escape shack in the woods as survivors.

Cabin Fever 2: Spring Fever (2009) 

Following the events of the previous installment, the predatory flesh-eating disease begins to spread. As a group of friends: John, Cassie, Alex, and Liz start their evening in excitement for their high school prom night; contaminated water begins to spread the affliction throughout the night. Through a series of events, one by one the event's attendees succumb to the sickness. Together the friends fight to stay alive through the night, while they watch their peers horrifically die before them.

Cabin Fever: Patient Zero (2014) 

When a group of friends named Marcus, Kate, Josh, Penny, and Dobbs believe that they're going to experience a bachelor party to remember, they travel a privately-owned island in the Caribbean. As they celebrate the occasion together, they discover the locale is not as remote as they had been told when they stumble upon a research facility running tests on an imprisoned a man who is infected by an undisclosed disease. When the extremely contagious deadly flesh-eating virus is released from its containment, the friends quickly scramble to escape the island, all while fighting to last the rapid outbreak.

Cabin Fever (2016) 

In October 2014, it was announced that remake of the 2002 film was being developed, using the same script as the original. Directed by Travis Z, the new adaptation was poorly received by audiences and critics alike. While the production made minor changes, it was declared inferior to its source material with critiques directed at its near shot-for-shot depiction of the first movie, while replacing the comedy elements with a grounded dark interpretation instead.

Despite its rejection from the audience, franchise creator Eli Roth appreciated the movie, praising the filmmaker; stating: "I saw it and I was blown away. I couldn't believe it. Travis Zariwny the director did a fantastic job."

Principal cast and characters

Additional crew and production details

Reception

Box office and financial performance

Critical response

References 

Film franchises introduced in 2002
Horror film franchises